Ibush Jonuzi (born 28 January 1950) is a politician in Kosovo. He participated in Ibrahim Rugova's parallel governing structures in the 1990s and served two terms in the Assembly of Kosovo in the mandate of the United Nations Interim Administration Mission in Kosovo (UNMIK). Jonuzi is a member of the Democratic League of Kosovo (Lidhja Demokratike e Kosovës, LDK).

Early life and career
Jonuzi was born in the village of Pasoma in the municipality of Vučitrn (Albanian: Vushtrri), in what was then the Autonomous Region of Kosovo and Metohija in the People's Republic of Serbia, Federal People's Republic of Yugoslavia. He graduated from Boris Kidrić High Technical School in Kosovska Mitrovica in 1973 and began working in Trepča Mines in the same year, rising to the position of technical director. He was arrested in 1989 against the backdrop of that year's miner's strike, amid the worsening political situation in the province.

He returned to Trepča in 2014 and worked as a deputy manager until his retirement.

Politician
During the 1990s, most members of the Kosovo Albanian community boycotted Serbian state institutions and participated in parallel governing structures. Jonuzi was elected to the "parallel" parliament as a LDK member in the 1992 general election. In February 1998, he was elected to the party's general council. He assisted with the concerns of internally displaced members of the Albanian community in the Vushtrri area during the early period of the Kosovo War in 1998.

Jonuzi appeared in the second position on the LDK's electoral list for Vushtrri in the 2000 Kosovan local elections and was elected when the list won twenty mandates. He served for one term and did not seek re-election in 2002.

Parliamentarian (UNMIK mandate)
Jonuzi was elected to the Assembly of Kosovo in the 2001 parliamentary election. The LDK won a convincing victory; Jonuzi served as a supporter of the administration and was a member of the assembly's trade and industry committee.

He was given the twenty-sixth position on the LDK's list in the 2004 parliamentary election and was re-elected after the list won forty-seven mandates. The LDK remained the dominant force in Kosovo's coalition government after the election, and Jonuzi continued to serve as an administration supporter. In this term, he chaired the assembly committee on economy, trade, industry, energy, transport, and telecommunications.

In the 2007 parliamentary election, held under open list proportional representation, Jonuzi finished in fifty-sixth place among the LDK's candidates. The list fell to twenty-five seats, and he was not re-elected.

Jonuzi ran for mayor of Vushtrri in the 2009 local elections and finished third. He has not returned to active political life since this time.

Electoral record

Local

Notes

References

1950 births
Living people
Kosovo Albanians
People from Vushtrri
Members of the Assembly of Kosovo (1990s parallel institution)
Members of the Assembly of Kosovo (UNMIK mandate until 2008)
Democratic League of Kosovo politicians